The Old Courthouse, Warren County, also known as Warren County Courthouse, stands prominently on a hill in Vicksburg, Mississippi, and was a symbol of Confederate resistance during the Siege of Vicksburg. It was designated a National Historic Landmark in 1968 and a Mississippi Landmark in 1986. The landmarked area comprises the entire Courthouse Square, which includes the courthouse and four attached buildings that were originally cistern houses for catching rainwater to fight fires, but these were later converted into offices.

Atop one of the highest bluffs in Vicksburg, construction began in the summer of 1858. The property for the new building was donated to the city by its founder, Newitt Vick. The Weldon brothers from Rodney, Mississippi, were hired to build the courthouse, which was completed in 1860 at a cost of $100,000.

During the Civil War, the building was one of the main targets in Vicksburg. As hard as the Union tried, the building suffered only one major hit. After a 47-day siege, on July 4, 1863, the Stars and Bars were lowered and the Stars and Stripes were raised. Many historical figures have visited the courthouse over the years, including Jefferson Davis, Booker T. Washington, William McKinley, and Theodore Roosevelt.

Famous trials were conducted in the building's second-floor courtroom. One was of freed slave Holt Collier, who in 1867 was arrested and charged with the murder of a white police officer from North Mississippi. He was acquitted of all charges for defending his former owner's name.

The original iron doors and shutters are still on the building today.

On June 3, 1948 the museum opened its doors, thanks to Eva Whitaker Davis. Mrs. Davis is the founder of the Vicksburg and Warren County Historical Society.

References

External links

Vicksburg Old Court House Museum

National Historic Landmarks in Mississippi
County courthouses in Mississippi
Government buildings completed in 1861
History museums in Mississippi
Museums in Warren County, Mississippi
Clock towers in Mississippi
Buildings and structures in Vicksburg, Mississippi
1861 establishments in Mississippi
Mississippi Landmarks
National Register of Historic Places in Warren County, Mississippi
Greek Revival architecture in Mississippi